The Beggar Student is a 1931 British operetta film directed by Victor Hanbury and John Harvel and starring Shirley Dale, Lance Fairfax and Jerry Verno. It was based on the 1882 operetta The Beggar Student composed by Carl Millöcker. A separate German film was made the same year.

It was made at Beaconsfield Studios as a quota quickie. The film's sets were designed by Norman G. Arnold.

Cast
Shirley Dale as Tania  
Lance Fairfax as Carl Romaine  
Jerry Verno as Jan Janski  
Frederick Lloyd as Colonel Ollendorff  
Mark Daly as Sergeant  
Jill Hands as Broni  
Margaret Halstan as Countess Novalska  
Edward Ashley as Nicki

References

Bibliography
Low, Rachael. Filmmaking in 1930s Britain. George Allen & Unwin, 1985.
Wood, Linda. British Films, 1927–1939. British Film Institute, 1986.

External links

British historical musical films
1930s historical musical films
Operetta films
Films directed by Victor Hanbury
Quota quickies
Films shot at Beaconsfield Studios
Films set in Poland
Films set in the 18th century
Films based on operettas
British multilingual films
British remakes of German films
British black-and-white films
1931 multilingual films
1930s English-language films
1930s British films